"Half Heaven – Half Heartache" is a song released by Gene Pitney in 1962. The song spent 12 weeks on the Billboard Hot 100 chart, peaking at No. 12, while reaching No. 4 on Canada's CHUM Hit Parade, and No. 5 on Billboards Middle-Road Singles chart.

Chart performance

Cover versions
In 1976, the horn-rock band Straight released a version of the song as a 7" 45-rpm single, with Back To The Music as the B-side.
In 2000, Jane Olivor released a version of the song on her album Love Decides, featuring Gene Pitney singing harmony.
In 2009, Rod MacDonald released a version of this song on his album After The War, featuring its composer, George Goehring playing piano.

References

1962 songs
1962 singles
Musicor Records singles
Gene Pitney songs
Songs written by Aaron Schroeder
Songs written by Wally Gold